The Memory of Whiteness is a science fiction novel written by Kim Stanley Robinson and published in September 1985. It shares with the Mars trilogy a focus on human colonization of the Solar System and depicts a grand tour that travels from the outer planets inward toward the Sun, visiting many human colonies along the way. The different human societies on the various planets and planetoids visited are depicted in detail. The purpose of the tour is to stage concerts by the "Holywelkin Orchestra", a futuristic musical instrument played by a selected master. Readers follow the Orchestra and its entourage together with a journalist, who after some time detects a conspiracy that seems to be connected with a group of gray-clad, sun-worshipping monks. The tour ends near the planet Mercury in a solar station belonging to these "Grays", which controls the white line energy source for the whole Solar System.

Reception
Dave Langford reviewed The Memory of Whiteness for White Dwarf #76, and stated that "this is impressive for its scope and feel of connecting the two cultures: both music and multidimensional physics sound convincing."

Reviews
Review by Faren Miller (1985) in Locus, #295 August 1985
Review by Stuart Napier (1985) in Fantasy Review, October 1985
Review by Don D'Ammassa (1985) in Science Fiction Chronicle, #75 December 1985
Review by Doc Kennedy (1985) in Rod Serling's The Twilight Zone Magazine, December 1985
Review by Tom Easton (1986) in Analog Science Fiction/Science Fact, January 1986
Review by Andrew Andrews (1986) in Science Fiction Review, Spring 1986
Review by Algis Budrys (1986) in The Magazine of Fantasy & Science Fiction, February 1986
Review by Keith Soltys (1986) in Science Fiction Review, Summer 1986
Review by Tom A. Jones (1986) in Vector 132
Review by Pascal J. Thomas (1986) inThrust, #24, Summer 1986
Review by Ken Lake (1987) in Paperback Inferno, #65
Review by Paul Kincaid (1987) in Foundation, #38 Winter 1986/87
Review [German] by Norbert Kupper (1988) in Science Fiction Times, April 1988
Review by K. V. Bailey (1999) in Vector 206
Review? [French] by Claude Ecken (2006) in Galaxies, #39

References

1985 American novels
American fantasy novels
Novels set on Mercury (planet)
Novels about music
Novels by Kim Stanley Robinson
Fiction about the Solar System